The Szeged Transport Ltd. is the name of the transport company of the city of Szeged, Hungary.

Aims
The Szeged Transport Ltd.'s aims are: the operation of electric track-based transport, a public pay parking system, vehicle rescue and transport, and parking.

Brief history

The Szeged Transport Ltd. was established in 1885. The first tramways were launched on October 1, 1908.

After the First World War the tramway transport, both the public transport from 1920, and the freight transport from 1925, declined steadily in Szeged.

No major operations or clashes occurred in Szeged during World War II, therefore the tram network was not damaged.

The importance of the freight transport continued to decline in the 1950s, and in 1971 it ceased to exist.

On April 29, 1979 first trolleybus started service on line 5, linking Újszged, city centre and Bartók square.

Then other lines alsó were launched: line 6 in 1982, line 7 (not the same as line 7 nowadays) and line 8 in 1983 and line 9 in 1985.

After 1990 the SZKT became the property of Szeged.

Organisation

Organizational units
The company operates two sectors: tramways and trolleybuses in an integrated system. However, the city's bus network does not fall under the competence of the SZKT, it is operated by the Dél-alföldi Közlekedési Központ Zrt. (DAKK)..

Parking System

The SZKT operates the parking system within the city centre which was established in 1996.

There exist two (green & yellow) parking zones between which the advance parking tickets ensure interoperability.

Szeged Airport

Since 2006 the SZKT has also been operating the Szeged Airport.

Vehicles

Tramways

Trolleybuses

Autobuses

Statistics 
The length of the entire network which includes the length of all connections, is 81 km. The number of stops is 171 (92 tramways and 79 trolleybuses) and the vehicle fleet contains 129 vehicles (61 tramsways, 49 trolleybuses and 19 autobuses).

Traffic data 

Street number distribution in 2005: SZKT: 46%, Tisza Volán: 54%

Street number distribution in 2008: SZKT: 49%, Tisza Volán: 51%

Leadership

Acting directors

Current Management

References

External links
 

1885 establishments in Hungary
Public transport companies in Hungary
Organisations based in Szeged
Intermodal transport authorities in Hungary